Chekuyevo is a rural locality (a selo) in Chekuyevskoye Rural Settlement of Onezhsky District, Arkhangelsk Oblast, Russia. The population was 3 as of 2010.

Geography 
It is located on the left bank of the Onega River, 88 km southeast of Onega (the district's administrative centre) by road. Pyantino is the nearest rural locality.

References 

Rural localities in Onezhsky District
Onezhsky Uyezd